Dama or DAMA may refer to:

Animals
Dama gazelle (Nanger dama)
Dama (genus) (fallow deer)
Fallow deer (Dama dama)
Persian fallow deer (Dama mesopotamica)
Tammar wallaby or Dama wallaby (Macropus eugenii)

Business, science and technology
DAMA, abbreviation for "discharged against medical advice"
Demand Assigned Multiple Access, a bandwidth allocation strategy
DAMA/NaI, an experiment to detect dark matter
DAMA/LIBRA, successor experiment to DAMA/NaI
Data Management Association, also known as the Global Data Management Community (Dama International); see Data administration
DAMA protocol ("Document, Assess, Monitor, Act"), a principle used in taxonomy, infectious disease, and parasitology (e.g. Hoberg et al.)

Culture
Dama, a name for Turkish draughts
Dama, stage name of Rasolofondraosolo Zafimahaleo, founding member of the Madagascar folk-pop band Mahaleo
Dama (Dune), a fictional character in Chapterhouse Dune (1985) by Frank Herbert
Dama-fruit, a fictional fruit in Dorothy and the Wizard in Oz, which renders its eaters invisible
D.A.M.A, a Portuguese band
Chinese Dama, a group of middle-aged Chinese women who rushed to purchase gold as investment in 2013

Geography
Dama Chiefdom, a chiefdom in Sierra Leone
Dama, Syria, a village
Dama, Tongxiang, a town in Tongxiang, Zhejiang Province, China

Other uses
Dama ceremony, a ceremony venerating the dead in the Dogon religion
Dama, or temperance, a Hindu virtue of self-control and self-restraint

See also
 Dama language (disambiguation)
 Dama y obrero (disambiguation)
 

es:Dama